Chloroclystis velutina is a moth in the family Geometridae. It was described by Warren in 1897. It is found on Sulawesi.

References

External links

Moths described in 1897
velutina